Keba Jeremiah (born 18 October 1986) is an Indian guitarist and music producer. He works on musical soundtracks for Gospel songs, Bollywood, Tollywood (Telugu), Kollywood music industry.

Early life
Born and brought up in Al Karama, Dubai, Keba Jeremiah started playing music at the age of seven. He began taking guitar lessons as a kid. Keba started off on the acoustic guitar and later learnt keyboard and drums along with his two brothers. At the age of ten, he started playing for various audiences at church programs and Christian events. For his school band, he tried his hands at the bass guitars. As the guitarist of the Our Own English High School band, he won awards at various inter-school level competitions. By the year 2004, for pursuing a professional engineering degree, he flew to India and joined the Hindustan College of Engineering, Chennai. Keba started playing at the New Life Assemblies of God Church every Sunday. He drew inspiration watching various leading musicians in the city at work. As a youth, Keba spent hours jamming with friends and experimenting with different sounds and styles. He and his friends formed a band titled "Fire Frenzy". In 2005, he began teaching music at the Institute of Music Technology, Chennai, run by John Satya.

Musical career
After his graduation he formed a band titled Fire Frenzy a Christian band that which consisted of Keba and his college mates. Though he didn't realize it at the time, playing at Church and with friends jump-started his musical journey. During this time, he also started teaching music at the Institute of Music Technology, Chennai. He began his industry career with music director James Vasanthan for the soundtrack of the 2008 Tamil film Subramaniapuram that grabbed various awards and critical acclaim for its music. Further, Keba collaborated with composers Yuvan Shankar Raja, Manikanth Kadri, Harris Jayaraj, Ouseppachan, A. R. Rahman, James Vasanthan, Anirudh Ravichander, D. Imman etc. . Keba has also played at various live shows collaborating with artists like Lesle Lewis, Naresh Iyer and Vijay Prakash and international artists namely Don Moen, Bob Fits, Steve Kuban and Sean Michael. He has also lent his musical knowledge for different television shows and music competitions like Airtel Super Singer, Sun TV's "Ooo La La.." and Vijay TV's "Kadhal Unplugged".

Post the success of Keba's work for the songs of 2011 musical drama film Rockstar scored by A. R. Rahman, the former has been frequently collaborating with the composer's film score outings.

As of 2013, he has played various guitars in an estimated 500 different albums. In 2013, he worked on Rahman's film soundtracks Kadal, Maryan and Raanjhanaa. In the same year, his work for songs of the film Sutta Kadhai, Vanakkam Chennai and both blockbuster Bollywood films Chennai Express and Yeh Jawaani Hai Deewani were noteworthy. Along the way, Keba Jeremiah also played in various Gospel Albums and concerts. One day, he was called by A.R Rahman to his studio to meet him for his next project. Keba started showing his amazing skills with his guitar and Rahman was amazed with Keba's groove and play. Its then when Joshua Prince started to work along with Keba Jeremiah in Maryan, Kadal, 24 etc.

In 2013, he had wrapped up work on independent albums of artists Andrea Jeremiah and Malavika Manoj. Keba then has continued to venture in his musical career and played over 800 songs along his journey. Keba Jeremiah is currently attached to a band name RIJK ( Rodney Jayaraj, Isaac Dharmakumar, John Praveen & Keba Jeremiah ). RIJK is popular in making cover songs both in Gospel and Tamil songs. The group plays more of a mix genre of Rock, RNB, Jazz and Fusion. Number of Indian singers have worked along in their cover songs such as Pragathi Guruprasad, Jonita Gandhi, Andrea Jeremiah, Nikhita Gandhi, Alisha Thomas, and Ash King.

Musical journey
Keba has produced music for Tamil and Hindi films including Paiya, Pasanga, Engeyum Kadhal, Savari, 3 Kings, Avan Ivan, Mankatha, 3, Action Replay, Rockstar and Ek Deewana Tha.

Keba has also played at various live shows collaborating with artists like Lesle Lewis, Naresh Iyer and Vijay Prakash and Christian artists like Don Moen, Bob Fits, Steve Kuban and Sean Michael. He has also lent his musical talent for different television shows and music competitions like Airtel Super Singer, Sun TV's Ooo La La.. and Vijay TV's Kadhal Unplugged.

Keba works on a lot of experimental music and plans to dedicate a lot more time working on unplugged music. He is currently working on his own album and plans to infuse it with the different styles of music he has perfected over the years. His playing style is greatly influenced by Jazz, Rock, RnB and acoustic styles of music. The man who makes music must take a break some time, and when he unwinds, Keba's playlist includes music from different genres- Dave Matthews Band, John Mayer, Four play, Nikelback, Metallica, Lincoln Brewster, Jeremy Camp, Michael W. Smith and Jimmy Needham being some of his current favourites.

Live concerts

A.R Rahman's concert London
A.R Rahman's concert Chennai ( Nenje Ezhu ) 2016
A.R Rahman's concert ( The Magic of AR Rahman ) 2016
Anirudh Live in Concert 2016 - Malaysia
Anirudh Live in Concert 2016 - Toronto, Canada
Sid Sriram Live 2017 - Malaysia
Verasa Pogaiyile – A Musical Journey with D.Imman Live Concert 2017 ( Singapore )
A.R Rahman's One Heart
A.R Rahman's concert Dubai 2017
A.R Rahman's concert Sydney 2017
A.R Rahman's concert Manchester 2017
A.R Rahman's Encore Concert | Mumbai 2017, Hyderabad, Ahmedabad, Delhi
A.R Rahman's concert Bhubaneswar 2018
A.R Rahman's concert Cuttack 2018
Celebrating 25 years of Rahman

As a music director

Demonte Colony (songs only)
One of the most popular song in this movie is Vaada Vaa Machi sung by Anirudh Ravichander. Music director A.R Rahman took to his Twitter to wish Keba on his new endeavor which reads "Wishing our guitarist, Keba, the best in his first musical venture"

Instruments

Guitars
Acoustics - Taylor Guitars 410ce, Taylor Guitars 914ce, Taylor Guitars NS34, Cort Guitars Earth Series 1200 Nat, Maestro guitars Taylor Classical guitar
Electric - Ibanez JS2400, Fender Telecaster, Fender Stratocaster, Paul Reed Smith, Suhr
Bass - Sadowsky

For Recording purposes, Keba uses Guitar Rig for his classic guitar tones, and very much in love with Neumann condenser mics to record his acoustic piece very precisely.

List of movies Keba Jeremiah played

Tamil /Hindi Movies/Album

Subramaniyapuram
Rekka,
Kodi,
Kadal (2012),
Raanjhanaa,
Maryan,
Adhagappattathu Magajanangalay,
Kattappavae Kaanom,
Tamasha
Maanagaram (2016),
Janatha Garage (2016),
Remo (2016),
Kotigobba 2,
Kidaari,
Mohenjo Daro
Achcham Yenbadhu Madamaiyada,
I (2014),
Lingaa,
Naanum Rowdy Dhaan,
Kabali (2016),
Iraivi (2016),
Meen Kuzhambum Mann Paanaiyum,
Wagah (film) (2016),
Sarrainodu,
Vetrivel (2016),
Kodi (2017)
RUM (2016)
Kavalai Vendam (2016)
24 (2016)
Bairavaa (2017)
Dora(2017)
OK Jaanu ( Enna Sonna ) - 2017
Rarandoi Veduka Chudham ( Thakita Thakjham) - 2017
Kaatru Veliyidai
Mom
Velaikaran
Ippadai Vellum
Sanju
Thaana Serndha Kootam
Sarkar  
Sarvam Thaala Mayam
The Fakir of Venice
Petta
99 Songs
Aaradhike from Ambili
Bigil (2019)
 Master
 Doctor

References

External links
Official website

Living people
Indian male composers
Indian film score composers
People from Dubai
Indian expatriates in the United Arab Emirates
1986 births